Recreation resource planning is a rational systematic decision-making process about the future management of recreation resources and recreation opportunities. Recreation planning applies analytical tools to deter our human tendencies to make decisions based on predisposition, bias, inadequate analysis, group-think, insular perspective, resistance to change, and excessive self-confidence. It results in decisions that are more effective, efficient, fair, reasoned, and defensible.

General precepts

Recreation Resource Planners
Recreation resource planners are professionals and should have a university degree in recreation resource planning, urban or regional planning, landscape architecture, or a closely related field. Professional experience and professional certification (e.g., NRPA, AICP) may also fulfill this educational standard.

Sound Professional Judgment
The standard for decision making in recreation planning is sound professional judgment, defined as a reasonable decision that has given full and fair consideration to all of the appropriate information, that is based on principled and reasoned analysis and the best available science and expertise, and that complies with applicable laws.

A Contract with the Recreating Public
A recreation plan is a contract with the recreating public and affected stakeholders that transcends any one person or administration, and as such should be detailed, unambiguous, and provide for accountability.

Represent the Public Interest
Recreation resource planning is a collaborative public process that deters the bias of special interests, political intervention, or incremental unplanned decision making.

Recreation Resources
Recreation resources are those features in a setting that define a person’s experience, such as the natural and cultural resources, special values attached to an area, facilities, infrastructure, personnel, and management regulations and actions.

Recreation Opportunities
Recreation planners plan for recreation opportunities, defined as an occasion for a person to participate in a specific recreation activity in a particular outdoor setting in order to enjoy a desired recreation experience and gain the healthy benefits that accrue.

Recreation
The occasion of a person to participate in a specific recreation activity in a particular outdoor setting in order to enjoy a desired recreation experience and gain the healthy benefits that accrue. (Note---the historic term of “recreation” has largely been replaced by the phrase “recreation opportunity” as defined above).

Recreation Benefits
Recreation resource planning should promote the environmental, human and community wellness benefits that accrue from recreation participation such as improved physical and mental health, family cohesion, civility, social integration, child development, economic stimulation, work productivity, resource stewardship, and conservation ethic.

Recreation Diversity
Because there is no “average” recreationist, it is important to plan for and maintain a spectrum of diverse recreation opportunities.

Systems Approach
Recreation resource planners must consider how their resources fit into a larger regional system, how their potential recreation alternatives might contribute to regional recreation diversity, and how their opportunities can be linked to larger systems.

Recreation Justice
Recreation resource planning helps to ensure that all people have an opportunity to enjoy our great outdoors without prejudice of race, ethnicity, age, wealth, gender, beliefs, or abilities. Planning should also ensure that Treaty rights and the rights of aboriginal publics are fairly considered.

Recreation Allocation
Recreation resource planning requires recreation allocation decisions because not all types and number of people or activities can be accommodated in a particular setting at one time.

Recreation Compatibility
Some recreation uses are not compatible with other uses, and recreation planners have the responsibility to determine what, if any, uses should be permitted, and where those activities should be permitted. Strong preferences for specific recreation settings lead to competition for recreation resources among different user types. Conflict is also generated by how each user group perceives the others’ actions and values.

Recreation Niche
Because not all people can be accommodated in all places, recreation planning helps to focus on the special values and resources of a setting and to define the special niche within the larger spectrum of recreation opportunities.

Visitor Capacity
Visitor capacity is the prescribed number, or supply, of available visitor opportunities that will be accommodated in a specific location and specific time.

Resource Sustainability
Whereas natural and cultural resources define an outdoor recreation setting, it is fundamental that recreation resource planning and plans address how to integrate recreation use so as to harmonize with, protect, enhance, and sustain these important resources.

Reduction of Impact
Recreation planning should proactively consider ways to minimize and mitigate potential social and environmental impacts.

Recreation Stewardship
Recreation planning should consider how to best design, manage, and interpret settings so as to foster public appreciation, understanding, respect, behaviors, and partnerships that contribute to the stewardship of an area’s natural and cultural resources, and special values.

Resource Caretakers
Recreation planners also have a responsibility to consider how plans and decisions will affect the kind of resource legacy will be left to the next generation.

Principles for the planning process

A Process
While the specific terms and steps in a recreation planning process often vary across institutions, all recreation resource planning in some manner includes:

Identification of public issues, management concerns, opportunities, and threats through collaborative stakeholder involvement.

Establishment of planning and decision criteria for evaluating and selecting the preferred alternative.

Inventory of resources, the current situation, and the best available science and information.

Formulation of alternatives which address the significant issues and concerns.

Evaluation of the consequences, benefits, and effects of each proposed alternative.

Selection of a preferred alternative based upon a full and reasoned analysis.

Implementation and monitoring.

Plan adaptation or revision.

Legally Sufficient
Recreation resource planning is framed by various local, state, and federal laws and regulations, with the most significant and historic direction provided by the National Environmental Policy Act (1969) and its attendant Council on Environmental Quality regulations.

Judicial Doctrine
Good recreation planning is based upon the important judicial principles of being principled, reasoned, reasonable, sufficient, full, fair, and preponderance of the information.

Planning Considerations
An adequate recreation resource planning process and plan must address all of the significant public issues, management concerns, opportunities, and threats that are identified in the early stages of the planning process. Issues, concerns, opportunities and threats that are not deemed significant, do not need to be addressed in the plan.

Planning Inputs
Recreation resource planning requires the consideration of many inputs such as an inventory of existing plans and policies, current type and amount of recreation use (supply and demand), recreation trends, public issues, management concerns, regional supply of recreation opportunities, visitor and stakeholder preferences, economic impact of recreation participation, best available science, environmental conditions, and available information from recreation and resource monitoring.

Recreation Resource Publics
Recreation resource planning must try to engage and hear from all the diverse publics who value the recreation resource. The easily recognizable publics are often labeled visitors, local business, land owners and communities, but there may also be equally important publics who vicariously value the resource, some who have been displaced by past unacceptable conditions, some who do not have the ability to attend meetings, or some who live across the country but equally share in the ownership of the public resource.

Collaboration
The meaningful engagement and exchange with the public is essential throughout the planning process. Collaboration results in a clearer definition of public values, more creative alternatives, more reasoned and reasonable decisions, and a constituency that becomes better informed and committed to the plan and its implementation.

Science-Informed Planning
It is both a legal requirement and professional imperative to duly consider the best available science and expertise in the planning process and the plan’s implementation.

Comprehensive and Integrated
Recreation planning should consider other significant natural and cultural resources, uses, demands, and values in an integrated and comprehensive fashion. Functional planning, whereby one resource is planned for in a vacuum from other resources, is not appropriate and contrary to comprehensive and integrated planning.

Clear Management Alternatives
Recreation alternatives must be clear, comprehensive, and provide a reasonable range of choices for public consideration. Each alternative can be contrasted by its proposed objectives, desired future conditions, desired recreation experiences, facilities, management strategies and actions, quality standards, visitor capacities, economic value, projected budget requirements, and monitoring program.

Rigorous Analysis

The analytical stage in a planning process is the evaluation of alternatives whereby the alternatives should be sharply contrasted, and the pros and cons are rigorously evaluated so the reasons for and against each alternative become clear.

Principles for the plan

The Document
The effectiveness and utility of a plan is in part a function of its clarity, brevity, layout, and design. Materials used in the planning process should be retained in the administrative record, but the final approved document should be a valuable desktop working document.

Resource Management Prescription
The output of a recreation resource planning process is a management prescription for an area that includes such information as goals, objectives, desired future conditions, desired recreation experiences, facilities, management strategies and actions, quality standards, visitor capacities, a monitoring program, and budgetary needs.

Budgetary Tool
An effective recreation plan should include the projected budgetary needs to implement the plan. In this way the plan is a tool to prepare and justify annual budgets, for allocating budgets, and to guide annual work priorities, and facilitate the scheduling and sequencing of projects.

Principles for implementation

Implementing Partnerships
The successful implementation of a plan should involve collaboration with stakeholders, government agencies, partnerships, and alliances with communities, special interest groups, and the private sector.

Institutional Accountability
The responsible official charged with implementing the plan should periodically evaluate and report to the public on progress and accomplishments to date, factors affecting the plan’s implementation, and changes pending or made to the approved plan.

Plan Adaptability
A recreation resource plan should be adaptive to new science, information, uses, technology, trends, conditions, and other circumstances of importance. Any proposed change should be subject to the same level of deliberate analysis and public collaboration as went into the original decision.

Review and Revision
Given the significant and ongoing changes in our society and the recreation industry, it would be reasonable that recreation plans be formally reviewed and updated every 5–10 years.

These principles were developed by the Board of Directors of the National Association of Recreation Resource Planners, with input solicited from more than 1000 recreation planning professionals, and approved by the Board for distribution in April 2009.

See also
 Wildlife management
 Landscape planning

References 

Recreation
Land use